Aconaemys is a genus of rodent in the family Octodontidae. 
It contains the following species:
 Chilean rock rat (Aconaemys fuscus)
 Porter's rock rat (Aconaemys porteri)
 Sage's rock rat (Aconaemys sagei)

References

External links

 
Rodent genera
Mammals described in 1891
Taxa named by Florentino Ameghino
Taxonomy articles created by Polbot